River View Observer is a monthly newspaper owned by Ad Vantage Publishing Inc., headquartered in Jersey City, New Jersey, which also publishes the Bayonne Observer newspaper.

It began publication in 1998.
The River View Observer is one of the first niche publications to cover the Hudson County waterfront market.
The Observer devotes a substantial amount of space to editorial contributions from readers.
It includes sections such as Art Views (which highlights unknown and emerging artists), Live on Stage (which highlights new playwrights and theater groups), and River View Profile (which gives a voice to independent film directors, actors, and politicians). The Business Profile column highlights small business owners.

The River View Observer's focus of coverage is on what is commonly referred to as the "Gold Coast Area", a stretch of waterfront land running from Bayonne, Jersey City, Hoboken, West New York, North Bergen and Guttenberg with Cliffside Park and Edgwater to the north of Hudson County. It also covers the waterfront of Secaucus New Jersey, and in recent years has also moved with distribution and mail to inner city locations.

The River View Observer is an associate member of the New Jersey Press Association.

References 

Newspapers published in New Jersey
Mass media in Hudson County, New Jersey
Publications established in 1998
Companies based in Jersey City, New Jersey